Rónald Alfonso González Brenes (born 8 August 1970, in San Carlos) is a Costa Rican former professional footballer and current manager.

Club career
González made his professional debut for Saprissa on 14 July 1989 against Uruguay de Coronado but left them to move abroad and play for Dinamo Zagreb in Yugoslavia. He also had a short spell on loan at Vorwärts Steyr in Austria. He returned to play for Saprissa and won almost everything he could pursue, as the team's captain. During the late 1990s and early 2000s, he starred for the Comunicaciones of Guatemala where he was captain and champion of the Guatemalan tournament several times as well. In his playing days with Saprissa, he won five national championships and three CONCACAF Champions Cup, and was part of the team that played the 2005 FIFA Club World Championship Toyota Cup, where Saprissa finished third behind São Paulo and Liverpool.

He played a total of 318 games for Saprissa, scoring 26 goals. He retired in October 2006.

International career
He played for Costa Rica at the 1989 FIFA World Youth Championship in Saudi Arabia where he scored a goal against Colombia.

González made his senior debut for Costa Rica in a May 1990 warm-up match against Poland, just ahead of the 1990 FIFA World Cup in Italy. There, at 19 years of age, he scored a goal against Czechoslovakia, becoming the youngest player to score a goal in that World Cup. He earned a total of 65 caps, scoring 5 goals and represented his country in 19 FIFA World Cup qualification matches and at the 1991 CONCACAF Gold Cup as well as at the 1993 and 1997 UNCAF Nations Cups. Also, he was his country's captain during the 1997 Copa América and was a non-playing squad member at the 2001 Copa América.

His final international was an August 2000 friendly match against Venezuela.

International goals
Scores and results list Costa Rica's goal tally first.

Managerial career
After retiring as a player, González took up coaching and was in charge of the Costa Rica national under-20 football team and acted as caretaker for the senior national team. In December 2011 he was announced as manager of his former club Comunicaciones. In December 2012, González was reported to leave Comunicaciones for Saprissa with whom he became the 61st Costa Rica league title winning manager in May 2014.

On Tuesday September 30, Saprissa announced that has cut González from managing the team.

Managerial statistics

Personal life
He is married to Yuliana Gaitán and they have two children.

References

External links 

González's Dossier at Deportivo Saprissa official site
SturmArchiv
Rónald González Brenes at Footballdatabase

1970 births
Living people
People from San Carlos (canton)
Association football central defenders
Costa Rican footballers
Costa Rica international footballers
1990 FIFA World Cup players
1991 CONCACAF Gold Cup players
1997 Copa América players
2001 Copa América players
Deportivo Saprissa players
GNK Dinamo Zagreb players
SK Sturm Graz players
SK Vorwärts Steyr players
Comunicaciones F.C. players
C.S. Herediano footballers
Costa Rican expatriate footballers
Costa Rican expatriate sportspeople in Yugoslavia
Expatriate footballers in Yugoslavia
Yugoslav First League players
Expatriate footballers in Austria
Expatriate footballers in Guatemala
Costa Rican expatriate sportspeople in Austria
Costa Rican expatriate sportspeople in Guatemala
Costa Rica national football team managers
Costa Rica under-20 international footballers
Deportivo Saprissa managers
Comunicaciones F.C. managers
Expatriate football managers in Guatemala
Copa Centroamericana-winning players
Costa Rican football managers